The Reynard 01Q was a sports prototype race car, designed, developed and built by British manufacturer Reynard, for sports car racing, conforming to the FIA's LMP675/SR2, and later LMP900 class rules and regulations, in between 2001 and 2003.

References

Le Mans Prototypes
24 Hours of Le Mans race cars
Sports prototypes
Reynard Motorsport vehicles